Zirconium(II) hydride, ZrH2 is a molecular chemical compound which has been prepared by laser ablation and isolated at low temperature.

Zirconium(II) hydride has repeatedly been the subject of Dirac–Hartree–Fock relativistic calculation studies, which investigate the stabilities, geometries, and relative energies of hydrides of the formula MH4, MH3, MH2, or MH.

Zirconium(II) hydride has a dihedral (C2v) structure. In zirconium(II) hydride, the formal oxidation states of hydrogen and zirconium are −1 and +2, respectively, because the electronegativity of zirconium is lower than that of hydrogen. The stability of metal hydrides with the formula MH2 (M = Ti-Hf) decreases as the atomic number increases.

References

See also
 Zirconium hydride

Metal hydrides
Zirconium(II) compounds